Dysomma tridens is an eel in the family Synaphobranchidae (cutthroat eels). It was described by Catherine H. Robins, Eugenia Brandt Böhlke, and Charles Richard Robins in 1989. It is a tropical, marine eel which is known from off Belize, in the western central Atlantic Ocean. It is known to dwell at a maximum depth of 348 metres.

References

Synaphobranchidae
Taxa named by Charles Richard Robins
Taxa named by Eugenia Brandt Böhlke
Taxa named by Catherine H. Robins 
Fish described in 1989